The Doubles' sprint competition at the 2020 FIL World Luge Championships was held on 14 February 2020.

Results
The qualification was held at 09:00 and the final at 13:34.

References

Doubles' sprint